Ushas (Vedic Sanskrit:  / ) is a Vedic goddess of dawn in Hinduism. She repeatedly appears in the Rigvedic hymns, states David Kinsley, where she is "consistently identified with dawn, revealing herself with the daily coming of light to the world, driving away oppressive darkness, chasing away evil demons, rousing all life, setting all things in motion, sending everyone off to do their duties". She is the life of all living creatures, the impeller of action and breath, the foe of chaos and confusion, the auspicious arouser of cosmic and moral order called the Ṛta in Hinduism.

Ushas is the most exalted goddess in the Rig Veda, but not as important or central as the three male Vedic deities Agni, Soma, and Indra. She is on par with other major male Vedic deities. She is portrayed as a beautifully adorned young woman riding in a golden chariot or a hundred chariots, drawn by golden red horses or cows, on her path across the sky, making way for the Vedic sun god Surya, who is referred either as her husband or her son. Some of the most beautiful hymns in the Vedas are dedicated to her. Her sister is "Nisha" or Ratri, the deity of night.

Etymology 
Vedic  is derived from the word uṣá which means "dawn". This word comes from Proto-Indo-Iranian *Hušā́s ("ušā" in Avestan), which in turn is from Proto-Indo-European *h₂éusōs ("dawn"), and is related to "ēṓs" in Greek and "aušrà" in Lithuanian. It is also the basis for the word "east" in Indo-European traditions, state Mallory and Adams.

Ushas is related to the Proto-Indo-European goddess . Her cognates in other Indo-European pantheons include the Greek goddess Eos, the Roman goddess Aurora, the Lithuanian goddess Aušrinė, and the English goddess Ēostre (OE: ēastre), whose name is probably the root of the modern English word "Easter." According to Indologist Michael Witzel, a non-Indo-European example, but still closely related, is the Japanese goddess Uzume.

Description
Ushas is the prominent goddess of dawn in the Vedas. She is depicted as the one who imbues life to all beings, as the "life of all life" and "breath of all breaths", according to Jones and Ryan. She is revered as the deity who revivifies earth each day, drives away the chaos and the darkness, sets all things in motion, sends all living beings to do their duties in the Vedas.

Ushas is the most important goddess in the Vedic literature, but she is not as important as the three central male deities named Agni, Soma, and Indra. She is mentioned in far fewer hymns than these three, but nearly equal or more number of hymns than all other male and female deities in the Vedas.

Rigveda 
Ushas is mentioned in numerous hymns of the Rigveda. Forty of its hymns are dedicated to her, while her name appears in other additional hymns. She is thanked for and petitioned for driving away darkness in hymns 7.78, 6.64 and 10.172; bringer of light urged by Surya in hymn 3.61, and the chaser of evil demons in hymn 8.47. The Rigvedic hymn 1.48 describes her as drawn in a hundred chariots, revealed by the daily arrival of light, one who sets all motion to life and all life to motion, rousing people off to their duties. She is revered for giving strength in hymn 1.44, to Ṛta in hymn 3.61 and 7.75, and participating in daily restoration of order and fighting chaotic forces that threaten the world in hymn 1.113.

Ushas is described in Vedic texts as riding in a shining chariot drawn by golden-red horses or cows, a beautiful maiden bedecked with jewels, smiling and irresistibly attractive, who brings cheer to all those who gaze upon her. She dispels darkness, reveals treasures and truths that have been hidden, illuminates the world as it is. Hymn 6.64 associates her with wealth and light, while hymn 1.92 calls her the "mother of cows" and one, who like a cow, gives to the benefit of all people. Hymn 1.113 calls her "mother of the gods", while hymn 7.81 states her to be the mother of all living beings who petition her. She is the goddess of the hearth, states hymn 6.64. She symbolizes reality, is a marker of time and a reminder to all that "life is limited on earth". She sees everything as it is, and she is the eye of the gods, according to hymns 7.75–77.

She is variously mentioned as the sister of Ratri (night), Aditya and one who goes about her ways closely with deities Savitri and Surya. She is also associated with Varuna (sky, water) and Agni (fire).

In RV 6.64.1-2 (trans. Jamison), Ushas is invoked as follows:

Vedic:
  1. úd u śriyá uṣáso rócamānā ásthur apā́ṃ nórmáyo rúśantaḥ
     kr̥ṇóti víśvā supáthā sugā́ny ábhūd u vásvī dákṣiṇā maghónī
  2. bhadrā́ dadr̥kṣa urviyā́ ví bhāsy út te śocír bhānávo dyā́m apaptan
     āvír vákṣaḥ kr̥ṇuṣe śumbʰámānóṣo devi rócamānā máhobhiḥ

English translation:

  1. The shining Dawns have arisen for splendor, glistening like the waves of the waters.
     She makes all pathways, all passages easy to travel. She has appeared— the good priestly gift, the bounteous one.
  2. Auspicious, you have become visible; you radiate widely. Your flare, your radiant beams have flown up to heaven.
     You reveal your breast as you go in beauty, goddess Dawn, shining with all your might. 

In the "family books" of the Rig Veda (e.g. RV 6.64.5), Ushas is the divine daughter—a  —of Dyaus Pita ("Sky Father").

  5. Convey (it)—you who as the unsurpassable one with your oxen convey the boon at your pleasure, Dawn,
     you who are a goddess, o Daughter of Heaven. Become worthy to be seen with your munificence at the early invocation!

Contemporary reverence 
The revered Gayatri mantra, states George Williams, remains a daily reminder of Ushas in contemporary Hinduism.

According to Sri Aurobindo, Ushas is "the medium of the awakening, the activity and the growth of the other gods; she is the first condition of the Vedic realisation. By her increasing illumination the whole nature of man is clarified; through her [mankind] arrives at the Truth, through her he enjoys [Truth's] beatitude."

Ushas is regionally worshipped during the festival of Chhath Puja, in Bihar and Uttar Pradesh (India), and in Nepal.

See also
Aušra, Lithuanian goddess of dawn
Chhaya
Ēostre
Ratri
Surya
Saranyu
Shani
Disani
Ame-no-Uzume

References

Bibliography
 
 

Hindu goddesses
Rigvedic deities
Solar goddesses
H₂éwsōs
Hinduism and cattle
Dawn goddesses
Cattle deities
Horse deities